Greg Storer is an Australian country music singer and a cropping farmer who runs a property near Warren in Central Western New South Wales. He is the brother of country music singer Sara Storer, who encouraged him to write music and with whom he has performed duets, including his debut single "When I was a Boy" (2009) and on his first album Backwater (2010).  

According to The Land newspaper, Greg wrote his first song in 2003, called Billabong, about the waterhole where the family swam and caught yabbies, and Sara Storer  recorded the song on her third album. ABC Radio National described his debut album as "a collection of well-crafted down home stories of rural life" for which he "employed the cream of Australia's country musicians".

In January 2023, Greg will feature on the self-titled album by Storer, alongside his sister Sara and Greg's daughters Bonnie & Pip.

Discography

Collaborative albums

Awards

Country Music Awards of Australia
The Country Music Awards of Australia (CMAA) (also known as the Golden Guitar Awards) is an annual awards night held in January during the Tamworth Country Music Festival, celebrating recording excellence in the Australian country music industry. They have been held annually since 1973.

|-
| 2010
| "When I Was a Boy" by Greg Storer & Sara Storer
| Video Clip of the Year
| 

 Note: wins only

References

External links
Greg Storer at ABC Country
When I was a Boy; performed by Greg and Sara Storer; YouTube.

Australian country singers
Living people
Year of birth missing (living people)